The 1992–93 Courage National 4 North was the sixth full season of rugby union within the fourth tier of the English league system, currently known as National League 2 North, and counterpart to the Courage National 4 South (now National League 2 South).  Impending changes to the league structure by the RFU meant that several new leagues were to be introduced at the end of the season.  This meant that champions Harrogate were promoted into the 1993–94 Division 4 while everyone else fell to Courage League Division 5 North.  Relegation was particularly tough on newly promoted Rotherham as they finished level with Harrogate only to lose out to their Yorkshire rivals by virtue of a worse for/against record.

Structure

Each team played one match against each of the other teams, playing a total of twelve matches each. Changes to the league structure by the RFU for the 1993–94 season meant that the champions are promoted to Courage League Division 4 while the other twelve sides went into Courage League Division 5 South.

Participating teams and locations

League table

Sponsorship
Division 4 North is part of the Courage Clubs Championship and was sponsored by Courage Brewery.

Notes

See also
 National League 2 North

References

N4
National League 2 North